Frederik Robbert "Freek" van de Graaff (20 February 1944 – 24 June 2009) was a Dutch rower who won a bronze medal in the coxed fours at the 1964 Summer Olympics. His team mates were Marius Klumperbeek (cox), Lex Mullink, Bobbie van de Graaf and Jan van de Graaff. The three "van de Graaf(f)s" were all born in 1944.

References

1944 births
2009 deaths
Dutch male rowers
Olympic rowers of the Netherlands
Rowers at the 1964 Summer Olympics
Olympic bronze medalists for the Netherlands
People from Oegstgeest
Olympic medalists in rowing
Medalists at the 1964 Summer Olympics
Sportspeople from South Holland
20th-century Dutch people
21st-century Dutch people